The following is a partial list of dams in South Africa. 

In South African English (as well as Afrikaans), a dam refers to both the wall as well as the reservoir or lake that builds up as a consequence.

List of dams (reservoirs)

 N  Nett or working capacity
 G  Gross or maximum capacity
 I  The Bedford and Bramhoek dams form part of the Ingula Pumped Storage Scheme
 D  The Driekloof and Kilburn dams form part of the Drakensberg Pumped Storage Scheme
 P  The Kogelberg and Rockview dams form part of the Palmiet Pumped Storage Scheme
 S  The Steenbras Dam – Upper and Steenbras Hydro-Electric Lower Dam form part of the Steenbras Pumped Storage Scheme
 V  The Voëlvlei Dam is an off-channel reservoir supplied by canals from the Klein Berg River, Leeu River and Vier-en-Twintig River, and discharging by canal into the Great Berg River.

See also

 Water supply and sanitation in South Africa
 List of lakes of South Africa
 List of rivers of South Africa
 List of dams and reservoirs
 List of waterfalls in South Africa
 Drought
 Flood
 List of waterways
 Transvasement
 Water Management Areas, also known as WMA's.

References
 Dam Safety Office – Publications – List of South African Dams from the Department of Water and Sanitation
 Archived List of South African Dams from the Department of Water Affairs (South Africa)
 Department of Water & Environmental Affairs
 SANCOLD, the South African National Committee on Large Dams
 ICOLD, the International Committee on Large Dams

Notes

External links
 Reservoir Storage Summaries

Dams
South Africa